Sega All Stars was Sega's budget series for the Dreamcast in North America. It included a total of 17 titles, each retailing for $19.95 in the United States and $29.95 in Canada. Seven of these were first released as Dreamcast launch titles. Sega All Stars titles are typically rated "E for Everyone" by the ESRB, and typically have a sports theme, but there are a few exceptions.

Game covers were given an orange bar (as opposed to Europe's blue color scheme) with the brand name written from top to bottom. The disc labels were also changed to include a small circle and  the Sega All Stars brand printed inside of it. Also, in printing, original releases said "Sega Dreamcast" on the disc but the All-stars versions just simply said "Dreamcast" to match up games released with the black label. Original Dreamcast games were released in the white labels and said "Sega Dreamcast" on the inlay like the Sega All-stars labels.

In Japan, the budget line was known as Dreamcast Collection, or DoriKore for short. The first six games in the series feature completely redesigned cover art. Another 50 games in the series only featured a DoriKore sticker on the plastic wrapper, making these games otherwise indistinguishable from regular releases.

List of games

North America

Japan

 18 Wheeler: American Pro Trucker
 21: Two One
 Aero Dancing F
 Airforce Delta
 Black/Matrix Advanced
 Capcom vs. SNK 2: Millionaire Fighting 2001
 Capcom vs. SNK: Millennium Fight 2000 Pro
 Castle Fantasia Seima Taisen
 Close to: Inori no Oka
 Comic Party
 Confidential Mission
 Cool Boarders Burrrn
 Crazy Taxi 2
 Culdcept Second
 Cyber Troopers Virtual-On: Oratorio Tangram M.S.B.S. Ver. 5.4
 D+Vine (Luv)
 De La Jet Set Radio
 Dousoukai 2 Again & Refrain
 Ever 17: the out of infinity: Premium Edition
 Fighting Vipers 2
 Gaia Master Kessen! Seikiou Densetsu
 Grandia II
 Guilty Gear X
 Hanagumi Taisen Columns 2
 Happy Lesson
 Inoue Ryouko: Roommate
 Interlude
 Kidou Senkan Nadesico: Nadesico the Mission
 Memories Off 2nd
 Memories Off Complete
 Mercurius Pretty: End of the Century
 Miss Moonlight
 Moero! Justice Gakuen
 Napple Tale: Arsia in Daydream
 Never 7: The End of Infinity
 NFL 2K
 Pandora no Yume
 Power Stone 2
 Princess Maker Collection
 Puyo Puyo Fever
 Record of Lodoss War
 Renai Chu! Happy Perfect
 Roommate Asami: Okusama ha Joshikousei - Director's Edition
 Roommate Novel: Satou Yuka
 Segagaga
 Shenmue II
 Space Channel 5
 Tako no Marine
 Tentama: 1st Sunny Side
 The King of Fighters 2000
 The King of Fighters 2001
 The King of Fighters 2002
 The King of Fighters: Dream Match 1999
 Yoshia no Oka de Nekoronde...
 Yume no Tsubasa: Fate of Heart
 Zero Gunner 2

Legacy
Three Sega All Stars titles (Crazy Taxi, Sega Bass Fishing and Sonic Adventure) were remastered in high definition for the Dreamcast Collection in 2011, which also includes Space Channel 5: Part 2. Two Sega All Stars titles (Crazy Taxi and an updated version of Virtua Tennis) were ported to Android and iOS as free Sega Forever downloads.

See also 

 Nintendo Selects
 Sony's Greatest Hits and Essentials
 Microsoft's Platinum Hits and Xbox Classics

References

 
Budget ranges